Francisco Ramírez (born 14 March 1948) is a Mexican former field hockey player who competed in the 1972 Summer Olympics.

References

External links
 

1948 births
Living people
Mexican male field hockey players
Olympic field hockey players of Mexico
Field hockey players at the 1972 Summer Olympics
Pan American Games medalists in field hockey
Pan American Games silver medalists for Mexico
Field hockey players at the 1971 Pan American Games
Medalists at the 1971 Pan American Games